Randy and the Mob is a 2007 American crime comedy film written, directed by and starring Ray McKinnon. It also stars Lisa Blount, Walton Goggins and Bill Nunn, with a cameo by Burt Reynolds.

Randy and the Mob was filmed in August 2005 in several locations in and around Atlanta, Georgia, mostly in Villa Rica, Georgia. The film won the Audience Choice Award at the Nashville Film Festival.

Plot 
Good ol' boy Randy Pearson, a can't-win entrepreneur, finds himself in debt to mobsters when his latest scheme to keep his businesses afloat goes awry. With the IRS after him as well, he seeks a helping hand from his carpal-tunneled, baton-teaching wife, Charlotte; his estranged, gay twin brother, Cecil, and Tino Armani, a mysterious self-styled prophet with a knack for high fashion, Italian cooking and clog dancing.

Cast 
Ray McKinnon as Randy and Cecil Pearson
Walton Goggins as Tino Armani
Lisa Blount as Charlotte Pearson
Tim DeKay as Bill
Bill Nunn as Wardlowe
Brent Briscoe as Officier Griff Postell
Paul Ben-Victor as Franco
Sam Frihart as Four
Burt Reynolds as Elmore Culpepper (uncredited)

Soundtrack 
Released on CD by Lakeshore Records in September 2007, the Randy and the Mob soundtrack includes tracks by Andrew Bird's Bowl of Fire, My Morning Jacket, Ron Sexsmith, Brazzaville, Squirrel Nut Zippers, Bent Fabric, Patterson Hood, The Now People, Lance Palmer and the Dead Rebels, and John Swihart.

References

External links
 
 

2007 films
2000s English-language films
2007 independent films
2000s crime comedy films
American crime comedy films
American independent films
Films scored by John Swihart
Films set in Georgia (U.S. state)
Films shot in Atlanta
Mafia comedy films
2000s American films